S. Chellapandian was an Indian politician of the Indian National Congress and member of the legislative assembly of Madras state from Tirunelveli. He served as the Speaker of the Madras Legislative Assembly from 1962 to 1967.

Electoral performance

Notes 

Indian National Congress politicians from Tamil Nadu
1913 births
Year of death missing